Peter Hannan may refer to: 

 Peter Hannan (cinematographer) (born 1941), Australian cinematographer
 Peter Hannan (composer) (born 1953), Canadian composer and recorder player
 Peter Hannan (footballer) (1908–1938), Australian footballer
 Peter Hannan (producer) (born 1954), television producer, writer, singer-songwriter

See also
 Peter Hanan (1915–2008), New Zealand swimmer who competed at the 1938 and 1950 British Empire Games